Andini Aisyah Hariadi or better known by her stage name Andien (born August 25, 1985) is an Indonesian actress and singer. She was born in Jakarta, the eldest of the three children of Didiek Hariadi and Henny Sri Hardini. She married Irfan Wahyudi on April 27, 2015.

Discography

Studio albums
 Bisikan Hati (2000)
 Kinanti (2002)
 Gemintang (2005)
 Kirana (2010)
 #Andien (2013)
 Let It Be My Way (2014)
 Metamorfosa (2017)

References

External links
 

1985 births
Living people
Sundanese people
People from Jakarta
21st-century Indonesian women singers
Indonesian jazz musicians
Anugerah Musik Indonesia winners